Statistics of Japan Football League in the 1997 season.

Overview
It was contested by 16 teams, and Consadole Sapporo won the championship.

As a result of Cosmo Oil Yokkaichi's closure the previous year, Jatco F.C. and Mito HollyHock were promoted before the season.

League standings

Promotion and Relegation
Because Fukushima FC and Seino Transportation were disbanded, no relegation has occurred. At the end of the season, the winner and runner-up of Regional League promotion series, Sony Sendai and Albirex Niigata were promoted automatically.

1996
2
Japan
Japan